Full Force is the debut album by the Brooklyn, New York-based R&B group Full Force.

Track listing
"Alice, I Want You Just for Me!" - (Full Force, Howie Tee)  6:13
"Unselfish Lover"  5:30 	
"Please Stay"  4:33 	
"United" (featuring Howie Tee, Lisa Lisa & Cult Jam, The Real Roxanne, UTFO)  6:35
"Girl If You Take Me Home"  5:44 	
"The Dream Believer" 4:29 	
"Half a Chance"  4:39 	
"The Man Upstairs"  3:43 	
"Let's Dance Against the Wall"  3:41

All songs written and performed by Full Force, except where indicated.

Charts

Weekly charts

Year-end charts

Singles

References

External links
 Full Force-Full Force at Discogs

1985 debut albums
Full Force albums
Columbia Records albums
Albums produced by Full Force